Twilight was a UK video game development group, active from 1989 until around 1995, originally developing game conversions for Hi-Tec Software, Ocean Software and Thalamus Ltd on the 8-bit platforms: the ZX Spectrum, Amstrad CPC and Commodore 64. Later they developed games for Atari ST, Amiga, Game Boy, Genesis, Nintendo Entertainment System, Super NES, and IBM PC compatibles.

The group members were Andrew Swann, Peter Tattersall, Jason McGann, Stuart Cook, Mark Mason, Finlay Munro, Dave Box, Wayne Billingham, Mark Barker, Noel Hines, James Smart, Martin Severn, Andy Severn, and Rob Holman. In 1994, Tattersall and McGann left to form Hookstone.

Games
Delta Charge (1989, Thalamus Ltd)
Ruff & Reddy in the Space Adventure (1990, Hi-Tec Software)
Atom Ant (1990, Hi-Tec Software)
Plotting (1990, Ocean Software)
Yogi Bear & Friends: The Greed Monster (1990, Hi-Tec Software)
Rod Land (1991, Sales Curve Interactive)
Quick Draw McGraw (1991, Hi-Tec Software)
Darkman (1991, Ocean Software)
WWF WrestleMania (1991, Ocean Software)
Mega Twins (1992)
Bonanza Brothers (1992)
Video Kid (1992, Gremlin Graphics)
Cool World (1992, Ocean Software)
Yogi's Treasure Hunt (1993)
Frog Dude (cancelled)
Alfred Chicken (1993)

References

Defunct video game companies of the United Kingdom
Video game development companies